The South Carolina Office of the State Treasurer is a government organization responsible for all state government funds. The current treasurer is Republican Curtis Loftis, who assumed office January 12, 2011.

Responsibilities

The South Carolina Treasury Department is responsible for banking the annual budget passed by the South Carolina General Assembly. In 2022, the state budget was over $34 billion.

List of Treasurers

Since 1865, the state treasurer has been elected at-large and serves a term of four years.

Notes

References

Government-related organizations
State government finances in the United States